Glad Tidings (full title: Glad Tidings of the Kingdom of God) is a free Bible magazine published monthly by the Christadelphians (Brethren in Christ). The magazine was launched in 1884.

The stated aims of the magazine are:
 to encourage study of the Bible as God's inspired message to men;
 to call attention to the Divine offer of forgiveness of sins through Jesus Christ; 
 to warn men and women that soon Christ will return to Earth as judge and ruler of God’s worldwide Kingdom.

To this end the magazine contains articles such as A Closer Look at Bible Prophecy, Jews and Arabs to Find Lasting Peace and Three Steps to a Happier Life.

References

External links
www.gladtidingsmagazine.org

Christadelphian magazines
Free magazines
Religious magazines published in the United Kingdom
Magazines established in 1884
Monthly magazines published in the United Kingdom